is a railway station in the town of Matsushima, Miyagi Prefecture, Japan, operated by East Japan Railway Company (JR East).

Lines
Tetaru Station is served by the Senseki Line. It is located 27.3 rail kilometers from the terminus of the Senseki Line at Aoba-dōri Station.

Station layout
Tetaru Station has one side platform serving a single bi-directional track. There is no station building. The station is unattended.

History
Tetaru Station opened on April 10, 1928 as a station on the Miyagi Electric Railway. The line was nationalized on May 1, 1944. The station was absorbed into the JR East network upon the privatization of JNR on April 1, 1987. The station was closed from March 11, 2011 due to damage to the line associated with the 2011 Tōhoku earthquake and tsunami, and services replaced by a provisional bus rapid transit service.  The station was reopened on 30 May 2015.

Surrounding area
Miyagi Prefectural Route 27

See also
 List of railway stations in Japan

References

External links

 

Railway stations in Miyagi Prefecture
Senseki Line
Railway stations in Japan opened in 1928
Stations of East Japan Railway Company
Matsushima, Miyagi